The Profitable Arte of Gardening was the first book about gardening published in England, being first published in 1563 under the title A Most Briefe and Pleasaunte Treatise, Teaching How to Dresse, Sowe, and Set a Garden.  It was written by Thomas Hill, who went on to write the even more successful work, The Gardener's Labyrinth.

Contents
To protect against hail, the book advised hanging the skin of a crocodile, hyena or seal.

References

1563 books
1563 in England
English non-fiction books
Gardening in England
Gardening books
Treatises